The 2015 Exeter Sevens was the final tournament of the 2015 Rugby Europe Sevens Grand Prix Series. It was held over the weekend of 11–12 July 2015.

Teams
The 12 participating teams for the tournament:

Pool Stage

Pool A

Pool B

Pool C

Knockout stage

Bowl

Plate

Cup

2015
2015–16 in English rugby union
Grand Prix 3